Zosterogrammidae is an extinct family of millipedes containing three genera, each with a single species. Fossils are known from the Czech Republic, Scotland, and the USA. Zosterogrammidae constitutes the sole family of the order Zosterogrammida.

Description
Zosterogrammids have broad heads, 20 to 32 body segments, with a body tapering towards the head and rear. The dorsal plates of each segment are very broad and the rear portion of each is segment ornamented with lines. Superficially they are similar to the living Polyzoniida in body proportion.

Taxonomy and distribution
Zosterogrammidae is placed in its own order, Zosterogrammida.  Zosterogrammida is considered incertae sedis (uncertain placement) within the millipede subclass Chilognatha.

Family †Zosterogrammidae Wilson, 2005	
 Casiogrammus ichthyeros Wilson, 2005 - Lanarkshire, Scotland; Wenlock (Silurian)
 Purkynia lata Fritsch, 1899 - Nýřany, Czech Republic; Westphalian (Upper Carboniferous)
 Zosterogrammus stichostethus Wilson, 2005 - Illinois, USA; Pennsylvanian (Upper Carboniferous)

References

Millipede families
Silurian myriapods
Devonian myriapods
Carboniferous myriapods
Wenlock first appearances
Pennsylvanian extinctions